Noan Lelarge (born 23 June 1975, in Romilly-sur-Seine) is a former French road racing cyclist. In the 2001 Giro d'Italia, Lelarge tested positive for a banned steroid, and was consequently fired by his team .

Palmares

1999
2nd Tour de Gironde
2002
1st Boucle de l'Artois
1st Prologue Circuit des Ardennes
2004
2nd Circuit des Ardennes
2006
1st Stage 3 Tour de l'Ain
1st Stage 2 Tour du Limousin
1st Stage 2 Tour de la Somme
3rd Paris-Corrèze
2007
1st Stage 5 Tour de Normandie
1st Lyon Polymultipliée
2008
1st Tour de la Manche
1st Stage 2 Route du Sud
3rd National Time Trial Championships
3rd Paris-Corrèze
2010
1st Stage 2 Circuito Montañés

References

1975 births
Living people
People from Romilly-sur-Seine
Sportspeople from Aube
French male cyclists
Cyclists from Grand Est
20th-century French people
21st-century French people